Cyanothamnus rigenss, commonly known as the stiff boronia, is a plant in the citrus family Rutaceae and is endemic to south-eastern New South Wales in Australia. It is a low, compact shrub with mostly trifoliate, glandular leaves and white to pale pink, four-petalled flowers in the leaf axils.

Description
The eight stamens alternate in length with those near the sepals slightly longer than those near the petals. The stigma is about the same width as the style.

Taxonomy and naming
The stiff boronia was first formally described in 1863 by George Bentham who gave it the name Boronia polygalifolia var. robusta and published the name in Flora Australiensis.<ref name=APNI1>{{cite web|title=Boronia polygalifolia var. robusta|url= https://id.biodiversity.org.au/instance/apni/466242 |publisher=APNI|accessdate=13 February 2019}}</ref> In 1929 Edwin Cheel gave it the name Boronia rigens and published the description in Journal and Proceedings of the Royal Society of New South Wales. In a 2013 paper in the journal Taxon, Marco Duretto and others changed the name to Cyanothamnus rigens on the basis of cladistic analysis. The specific epithet (rigens) possibly refers to the habit of this species compared to that of B. polygalifolia and B. nana.

Distribution and habitatCyanothamnus rigens'' grows in heath and forest, sometimes on stabilised dunes between Bombala and Mt Coricudgy east of Rylstone.

References 

rigens
Flora of New South Wales
Plants described in 1929
Taxa named by Edwin Cheel